The Shetland Football Association runs Scotland's most northerly amateur association football league competitions, in Shetland, Scotland.  The association is affiliated to the Scottish Amateur Football Association.  Like several other Highland and Islands leagues, the fixtures are played over summer rather than the traditional winter calendar.

As of 2022, the association is composed of a two separate divisions one of eight clubs: an 'A' League (Premier League), and one of eleven clubs 'B' league (Reserve League),

League membership
In order to join the association, clubs must apply and are then voted in by current member clubs.

Shetland Football leagues

Premier League

Lerwick Celtic
Delting
Ness United
Scalloway
Lerwick Spurs
Lerwick Thistle
Whalsay
Whitedale

Reserve League

Lerwick Celtic Reserves
Delting Reserves
Ness United Reserves
Scalloway Reserves
Lerwick Spurs Reserves
Lerwick Thistle Reserves
Whalsay Reserves
Whitedale Reserves
Wastside Rebels
Bressay
Banks

Cup competitions

Premier League teams
Sinclairs Taxis Fraser Cup
Highland Fuels Cup
Northwards Manson Cup
Delta Marine Madrid Cup
GTS County Shield

Reserve League teams
Bloomfield Cup
Joint Cup

External links
Shetland FA League Website

Football leagues in Scotland
Football in Shetland
Organisations based in Shetland
Football governing bodies in Scotland
Sports organizations established in 1919
1919 establishments in Scotland
Amateur association football in Scotland